Battle of Montebello can refer to two battles, fought near Montebello, Province of Pavia, in Northern Italy:
Battle of Montebello (1800), in which the French defeated an Austrian army (9 June 1800).
Battle of Montebello (1859), in which a combined Sardinian-French army defeated an Austrian army, during the Austro-Sardinian War (20 May 1859).